Goundo is a nearly extinct Adamawa language of Chad. It is one of the three members of the Kim languages group, together with Kim and Besme.

The language is only spoken by older adults as many young people shifted to Kabalai and Nancere.

Ethnologue lists Goundo villages as Goundo-Bengli, Goundo-Nangom, and Goundo-Yila in Kélo and Lai subprefectures, Tandjilé Region.

References

Languages of Chad
Kim languages
Endangered languages of Africa